Yevgen Sotnikov (20 November 1980 – 6 August 2021) was a Ukrainian judoka.

He competed at the 2008 Olympic Games, but was knocked out after one match.

Sotnikov was sentenced to 15 years for murder in 2009 for shooting an 18-year-old in the head  for refusing to drink alcohol with him.

Sotnikov was killed on 6 August 2021, alongside two other prisoners, while serving his jail term. He was aged 40. According to Trilateral Contact Group member Haide Rizayeva Sotnikov was killed in a penal colony of the self-proclaimed Ukrainian breakaway state Donetsk People's Republic.

Achievements

References

External links
 
 

1980 births
2021 deaths
Sportspeople from Zaporizhzhia
Ukrainian male judoka
Olympic judoka of Ukraine
Judoka at the 2008 Summer Olympics
People convicted of murder by Ukraine
Ukrainian people convicted of murder
People murdered in Ukraine
Ukrainian people who died in prison custody
Prisoners murdered in custody
Prisoners who died in Ukrainian detention